The China–Albania Friendship Association was an organization based in China, with the aim of strengthening relations between the People's Republic of China and the People's Republic of Albania. The two states had a common position of denouncing 'revisionism' in the Soviet Union after the 20th Congress of the Communist Party of the Soviet Union.  As of 1961, Chiang Nan-Hsiang was the president of the Association.

See also
Sino-Albanian split

References

Albania friendship associations
People's Republic of China friendship associations
People's Socialist Republic of Albania
Albania–China relations
Anti-revisionist organizations